Spiritual Black Dimensions is the fourth studio album by Norwegian black metal band Dimmu Borgir. It was released in 1999 by Nuclear Blast Records. A deluxe edition was released in 2004 with bonus material. There is also a digipak edition of this album which contains no bonus tracks. The digipak has reflective/holographic cover art. This release featured keyboardist Mustis and the clean vocals of ICS Vortex, as well as the departure of long-time drummer Tjodalv, guitarist Astennu, and bassist Nagash. 

The album cover was part of the top 10 of Greatest Heavy Metal Album Covers by Blender magazine.  It was inspired by The Wounded Angel, a painting by Finnish artist Hugo Simberg.

Track listing

Reception
Steve Huey of AllMusic stated that "Dimmu Borgir's arrangements continue to increase in complexity and sophistication on Spiritual Black Dimensions, improving on its predecessors and illustrating the band's musical progression". In Slayer no. 13, Jon 'Metalion' Kristiansen called Spiritual Black Dimensions "a fine case of melodic, over-produced, symphonic metal. If you like this melodic style I can't really think of anyone doing it better […]. No, I wouldn't call this black metal. Read the interview with Funeral Mist for the right definition of black metal".

Personnel
Dimmu Borgir
 Shagrath – lead vocals
 Silenoz – rhythm guitar
 Astennu – lead guitar
 Nagash – bass guitar, backing vocals
 Tjodalv – drums
 Mustis – keyboards

 Guests
 ICS Vortex – clean vocals on tracks 1, 3, 7 and 9

 Technical staff
 Peter Tägtgren – mixing, engineering, producer

References

Dimmu Borgir albums
1999 albums
Nuclear Blast albums
Albums produced by Peter Tägtgren